Ptychobela griffithii is a species of sea snail, a marine gastropod mollusk in the family Pseudomelatomidae, the turrids.

Subspecies
 Ptychobela griffithii gracilior (Von Martens, 1904)

Description
The length of the shell varies between 30 mm and 50 mm.

The small, solid shell has a fusiform shape. When the ribs and the smooth spiral lirae come together, they create axial nodes on the shoulder of each whorl. The depressed sutures lack a subsutural cord. The rather wide, slightly concave aperture measures about half the total length of the shell. The wide siphonal canal is moderately long. The outer lip is somewhat thickened. The ground color of the shell is brown with white axial nodes.

Distribution
This marine species occurs in the Red Sea, off Oman, in the Bay of Bengal and off Japan.

References

 Subba Rao, NV (2003) Indian seashells Records of the Zoological Survey of India ZSI, Kolkata (Part 1) 416 pp Available at - NCL, Pune

External links
 Griffith, E. & Pidgeon, E. (1833-1834). The Mollusca and Radiata. Vol. 12, In: E. Griffith, [1824−1835, The Animal Kingdom arranged in conformity with its organization, by the Baron Cuvier, [...]. London: Whittaker and Co., viii + 601 pp., 61 pls. [1−138 (Date of publication according to Petit & Coan, 2008: pp 1-192, Mollusca pls. 1−39 - 1833; pp 193-601, pls. Zoophytes 2−20, Mollusca corrected pls. 28*, 36*, 37*, pls. 40-41 - 1834 ]
 
 Gastropods.com: Ptychobela griffithii
 Petit & Coan, The Molluscan Taxa Made Available In the Griffith & Pidgeon (1833–1834) Edition Of Cuvier, With Notes On the Editions Of Cuvier and On Wood's Index testaceologicus; Malacologia 50(1) · June 2008

griffithii
Gastropods described in 1834